"Voici les clés" is a song in French, and translates into English as "Here are the keys". It is a cover version of the Italian song "Nel cuore nei sensi" written in 1976 by Vito Pallavicini and Toto Cutugno and performed by the group Albatros, however it was translated into French and credited to Pierre Delanoë, Vito Pallavicini and Toto Cutugno.

Gérard Lenorman version

"Voici les clés" is a track performed in French by Gérard Lenorman and released in Europe in 1976. It was included on his 1976 album, Drôles de chansons ("Funny Songs").

7" single (CBS 4913)
 "Voici les clés" – 3:45
 "Comme une chanson bizarre" – 5:45

Charts

Toto Cutugno / Albatros version
Italian singer Toto Cutugno and his group Albatros originally wrote and sung Nel cuore nei sensi  and included it on their first album Volo AZ504 in 1976.  Then, in 1990, Toto Cutugno re-recorded the song twice in Italian and in French to be included on 1990's LP/CD Insieme 1992.  Insieme 1992 was released for both the Italian and French markets respectively.  The song was once again re-recorded in italian for the 2004 compilation Cantando, a compilation all Cutugno material during the 2004 season Star Academy which was held in France.

Gérard Lenorman and Tina Arena version

In 2011, Lemorman re-recorded "Voici les clés" with Australian recording artist Tina Arena for his album Duos de mes chansons, which translates from French as "Duets of my songs".

Promo CD
 "Voici les clés" performed by Gérard Lenorman featuring Tina Arena – 3:30

Charts
Released only in France, it charted at number 48.

References

1976 singles
2011 singles
1976 songs
Tina Arena songs
Gérard Lenorman songs
Songs written by Pierre Delanoë
Songs written by Toto Cutugno
Songs with lyrics by Vito Pallavicini